Ankur Raj Tiwari is an Indian politician and a member of the Uttar Pradesh Legislative Assembly representing Khalilabad (Assembly constituency) in Sant Kabir Nagar district of Uttar Pradesh.

Early life and political career
Ankur Raj Tiwari was born in a Brahmin family on 23 September 1991 in Sant Kabir Nagar (then a part of Basti), Uttar Pradesh. His father is Uday Raj Tiwari.

In October 2021, Tiwari was granted a membership of Bharatiya Janata Party by BJP Uttar Pradesh state president Swatantra Dev Singh, marking his entry into active politics. He was announced as the BJP candidate in the 2022 Uttar Pradesh Legislative Assembly election from Khalilabad constituency in Sant Kabir Nagar district of Uttar Pradesh. He won the polls defeating Digvijay Narayan Chaubey of the Samajwadi Party by a margin of 12622 votes.

References

External links 
 

Living people
Uttar Pradesh MLAs 2022–2027
1988 births
Bharatiya Janata Party politicians from Uttar Pradesh